Suzana Straus is a Canadian chemist who is a professor at the University of British Columbia. Her research considers membrane proteins and their role in cellular processes.

Early life and education 
Straus is from Montreal. She graduated from McGill University with honours in 1993. She completed her doctoral research at ETH Zurich, where she developed new techniques to improve the resolution of nuclear magnetic resonance measurements. Her doctoral research was supported by the Natural Sciences and Engineering Research Council.

Research and career 
Straus moved to the United States, where she was awarded an NSERC fellowship to join the University of Pennsylvania and a postdoctoral scholar. She was awarded a Dorothy Hodgkin Fellowship in 2000 and moved to the University of Oxford where she worked on structural studies of membrane proteins. In particular, she worked on solid-state magic-angle nuclear magnetic resonance techniques.

In 2002, Straus moved to Vancouver, where she was made a Professor of Chemistry at the University of British Columbia. Her research considers the identification of proteins in their native environments. She combines several spectroscopic and structural probes, including circular dichroism and differential scanning calorimetry. Her experimental research is used to determine structure-property relationships in biomolecules.  She has studied the proteins associated with human herpesvirus 6 and human betaherpesvirus 7, and the interactions of these proteins with other binding partners. Straus has smultaneously looked to establish structure-function relationships in antimicrobial peptides.

Selected publications

Personal life 
Straus has two sons. She has campaigned for the government to improve the provision of French speaking education for Canadian children. She served as President of the Federation of Francophone Parents of British Columbia.

References

Canadian women chemists
Academic staff of the University of British Columbia
ETH Zurich alumni
McGill University alumni
Living people
Year of birth missing (living people)